The large-scale righteye flounder (Nematops grandisquama) is a flatfish of the family Pleuronectidae. Its natural habitat is the tropical waters of the Indo-West Pacific, from Bali to Indonesia and the southwest coast of India.

Description
The large-scale right-eye flounder is, as its name suggests, a right-eyed flatfish. It has a slender body, 2.2 to 2.4 times long as it is wide, with a short pectoral fin. It has a tentacle on each eye.

Diet
The diet of the large-scale right-eye flounder consists of small zoobenthos organisms.

References

large-scale righteye flounder
large-scale righteye flounder
large-scale righteye flounder